Danny Wimmer Presents (DWP) is a music festival production and promotion company headquartered in Los Angeles, California. Focusing primarily on the rock music scene, DWP is one of the smallest high-capacity national promoting companies in the United States. In addition to being ranked on Pollstar's Top 100 Promoters Worldwide in 2014 and 2015, Since 2011, DWP has created, developed and produced events including Rock on the Range, Aftershock, Louder than Life, Welcome to Rockville & Carolina Rebellion.

Music festivals 
Aftershock is a rock and heavy metal music festival in Sacramento, California.

Carolina Rebellion was an annual rock music festival held in Concord, North Carolina. Due to a split between DWP and AEG, it was replaced in 2019 by Epicenter. 

Louder Than Life is a rock and metal event in Louisville, Kentucky.

Rock on the Range was a rock music festival in Columbus, Ohio that was co-produced by Danny Wimmer Presents and Live Nation. It was replaced in 2019 by Danny Wimmer Presents as the Sonic Temple Art & Music Festival.

Welcome to Rockville is a hard rock and heavy metal music festival in Daytona Beach, Florida.

References

Companies based in Los Angeles
Companies established in 2011
2011 establishments in California